Kaltenbachiella japonica, is an aphid in the superfamily Aphidoidea in the order Hemiptera. It is a true bug and sucks sap from plants.

References 

 http://animaldiversity.org/accounts/Kaltenbachiella_japonica/classification/
 http://www.nbair.res.in/Aphids/Kaltenbachiella-japonica.php
 http://aphid.speciesfile.org/Common/basic/Taxa.aspx?TaxonNameID=1161173
 https://www.uniprot.org/uniprot/A0A096VK42

Eriosomatinae
Agricultural pest insects